Radinocera is a genus of moths of the family Noctuidae. The genus was erected by George Hampson in 1908.

Species
 Radinocera maculosus Rothschild, 1896
 Radinocera vagata Walker, 1865

References

Agaristinae